{{Infobox alpine ski racer
|name           = Steve Mahre
|image          = Steve Mahre.png
|image_size     = 
|caption        = 
|disciplines    = Downhill, Super G,Giant Slalom, Slalom,Combined
|club           = White Pass
|birth_date     = 
|birth_place    = Yakima, Washington, U.S.
|death_date     = 
|death_place    =  
|height         =  1.76 m
|wcdebut        = January 27, 1976 (age 18)
|retired        = March 1984 (age 26)
|website        = mahretrainingcenter.com
|olympicteams   = 3 – (1976, 1980, 1984)
|olympicmedals  = 1
|olympicgolds   = 0
|worldsteams    = 4 – (1976–82)includes two Olympics
|worldsmedals   = 1
|worldsgolds    = 1
|wcseasons      = 9 – (1976–84) 
|wcwins         = 9 – (2 GS 6 SL, 1 K)
|wcpodiums      = 21 – (3 GS 14 SL, 4 K)|wcoveralls     = 0 – (3rd in 1982)|wctitles       = 0 – (3rd in SL, 1981, 1982)|show-medals    = yes
|medals         = 

}}
Steven Irving Mahre (born May 10, 1957 in Yakima, Washington) is a former World Cup alpine ski racer and younger twin brother (by four minutes) of ski racer Phil Mahre.

Career
Mahre won the silver medal in slalom at the 1984 Winter Olympics in Sarajevo, 0.21 seconds behind his brother. He won the gold medal in giant slalom at the 1982 World Championships in Schladming, Austria. His best finish in the overall standings was third in 1982 and fourth in 1981 (brother Phil was the overall World Cup champion in 1981, 1982, and 1983).

After nine seasons, the Mahre twins retired from the World Cup circuit following the 1984 season.  Steve finished his career with 9 World Cup victories and 21 podiums.

The book No Hill Too Fast'', written by the Mahre brothers, was published in 1985.

World Cup results

Season standings

Race victories
9 wins: 2 GS, 6 SL, 1 K
21 podiums: 3 GS 14 SL, 4 K

World championship results 

From 1948 through 1980, the Winter Olympics were also the World Championships for alpine skiing.

Olympic results

See also
List of Olympic medalist families

References

Further reading

External links
 
 
 Washington Sports Hall of Fame – Steve Mahre
 Mahre Training Center – get to know the Mahre brothers

ì

1957 births
Living people
Alpine skiers at the 1976 Winter Olympics
Alpine skiers at the 1980 Winter Olympics
Alpine skiers at the 1984 Winter Olympics
Sportspeople from Yakima, Washington
American male alpine skiers
Medalists at the 1984 Winter Olympics
Twin sportspeople
American twins
Olympic silver medalists for the United States in alpine skiing